Multi-spectral camouflage is the use of counter-surveillance techniques to conceal objects from detection across several parts of the electromagnetic spectrum at the same time. While traditional military camouflage attempts to hide an object in the visible spectrum, multi-spectral camouflage also tries to simultaneously hide objects from detection methods such as infrared, radar, and millimetre-wave radar imaging.

Among animals, both insects such as the eyed hawk-moth, and vertebrates such as tree frogs possess camouflage that works in the infra-red as well as in the visible spectrum.

History

The English zoologist Hugh Cott, in his 1940 book Adaptive Coloration in Animals, wrote that some caterpillars such as the eyed hawk-moth Smerinthus ocellatus, and tree frogs such as the red-snouted treefrog Hyla coerulea, are coloured so as to blend with their backgrounds whether observed in visible light or in infra-red. Cott noted the importance of camouflage in the infra-red, given the ability of tactical reconnaissance to observe in this part of the spectrum:

A German-led NATO research project concluded in 2004 that while "the multispectral signatures of most military equipment can be significantly reduced by combinations of various camouflage materials", multi-spectral camouflage for individual soldiers remained lacking. The main problems identified were operational constraints such as mobility, weight, and the soldier's physiology.

Camouflage
Multi-spectral camouflage can be applied to individuals, to vehicles, and to buildings. It can take the form of specialised paints or camouflage nets that provide conventional camouflage, reduce the amount of heat given off by an object, and alter the shape and size of its radar signature. The Saab Barracuda Mobile Camouflage System provides a degree of concealment in the visible, thermal infrared, and radar parts of the electromagnetic spectrum, as does the Miranda Berberys-R multispectral camouflage system from Poland.  

Saab AB began offering a multi-spectral personal camouflage system known as the Special Operations Tactical Suit (SOTACS) as early as 2005. And as of 2018, multiple countries are phasing out legacy camouflage systems with multi-spectral systems.

Examples across the electromagnetic spectrum

See also

 Multispectral image
 Electro-optical MASINT

References

Camouflage
Military technology